Damodar Bhandari is a nepalese politician and current Member of House of Representatives. He is Chairman of CPN (UML) Sudurpashchim Province Committee. He was also member of 2nd Nepalese Constituent Assembly. He won Baitadi–1 seat in CA assembly, 2013 and House of Representatives from Communist Party of Nepal (Unified Marxist–Leninist). He was also Minister of State for Finance, 2016.

Electorate History
He has been elected to the Member of House of Representatives and 2nd Nepalese Constituent Assembly from Baitadi 1. He lost the 2008 Nepalese Constituent Assembly election.

2017 legislative elections 

2013 Nepalese Constituent Assembly election

2008 Nepalese Constituent Assembly election

References

1973 births
Living people
People from Baitadi District
Communist Party of Nepal (Unified Marxist–Leninist) politicians
Nepal MPs 2017–2022
Nepal Communist Party (NCP) politicians
Members of the 2nd Nepalese Constituent Assembly
Nepal MPs 2022–present